Burton-cum-Walden is a civil parish in the Richmondshire district of North Yorkshire, England, in the Yorkshire Dales National Park.  It had a population of 303 according to the 2011 census.

The parish boundary is defined by the slopes of the Walden Beck valley (sometimes known as Waldendale). The western boundary runs from the outskirts of Aysgarth over Naughtberry Hill to Buckden Pike. The eastern boundary runs from the A684 over the top of Penhill and Harland Hill towards Buckden Pike. The parish includes the village of West Burton and the hamlets of Walden and Walden Head.

References 

Civil parishes in North Yorkshire
Wensleydale